Prime Empire is the twelfth season of the computer-animated Ninjago television series  (titled Ninjago: Masters of Spinjitzu before the eleventh season). The series was created by Michael Hegner and Tommy Andreasen. The season aired from 19 July to 30 August 2020, following the eleventh season titled Secrets of the Forbidden Spinjitzu. It is succeeded by the thirteenth season titled Master of the Mountain.

The theme of the twelfth season is video games, with the introduction of a fictional video game world in the Ninjago universe named "Prime Empire". The plot follows the main ninja characters as they search for the video game's creator following its re-emergence in Ninjago City. When players begin getting trapped inside the game, including the main character Jay, the ninja must enter the game to find their friend. The storyline involves the ninja characters having to compete in various games within Prime Empire before facing the main game boss named Unagami.

Voice cast

Main 

 Sam Vincent as Lloyd Garmadon, the Green Ninja
 Vincent Tong as Kai, the red ninja and Elemental Master of Fire
 Michael Adamthwaite as Jay, the blue ninja and Elemental Master of Lightning, and Nya's Yang.
 Brent Miller as Zane, the white ninja and Elemental Master of Ice
 Kirby Morrow as Cole, the black ninja and Elemental Master of Earth
 Kelly Metzger as Nya, the Elemental Master of Water and Kai's sister, and Jay's Yin.
 Paul Dobson as Sensei Wu, the wise teacher of the ninja
 Jennifer Hayward as P.I.X.A.L. a female nindroid
Dean Redman as Unagami

Supporting 
 Mark Hildreth as Milton Dyer/Game Voice
Michael Antonakos as The Mechanic
Adrian Petriw as Scott
Alessandro Juliani as Okino/Shifty
Shannon Chan-Kent as Racer Seven/Hostess
 Michael Donovan as Police Commissioner
Sharon Alexander as Ultra Violet
Paul Dobson as Warden Noble
Bill Newton as Fred Finely
Adrian Petriw as Fugi Dove
Lee Tockar as Cyrus Borg
Alan Marriott as Dareth

 Colin Murdock as Bob the Intern
 Sam Vincent as Ritchie
 Mary Black as Mrs Dyer
 Vincent Tong as Sushi Chef
 Michael Daingerfield as Tony the Bartender
 Zion Simpson as Child Unagami

Development 
Co-creator Tommy Andreasen stated on Twitter that Prime Empire was inspired by the urban legend Polybius, a fictitious 1980s arcade game.

Release 
A 30-second teaser trailer was released on 5 February 2020 on the Lego YouTube channel to promote the season. This was followed by the release of an official trailer on 10 March 2020. The season premiered on Cartoon Network on 19 July 2020 with the first episode titled Would You Like to Enter Prime Empire? The subsequent episodes were released throughout July and August 2020 until the release of the season finale titled Game Over on 30 August of the same year.

Plot 
When the old, legendary video game Prime Empire resurfaces, players begin to disappear into the game, including Jay (who loves playing video games). The ninja discover that the game's creator, Milton Dyer, has also disappeared and nobody has seen him for years. With the suspicion that Dyer is a villain named Unagami, Lloyd, Cole, Kai and Nya enter the virtual world of Prime Empire to stop Dyer's avatar, while Zane and P.I.X.A.L. remain outside to find Dyer in the real world. They meet "The League of Jay", a group of Jay fans who lead them to a player named Scott. He explains that players only get four lives in the game and after losing their last life, they are turned into digital cubes and disappear. Inside one of the game zones, a Samurai named Okino faces a crisis of faith when he repeatedly fails to lead a series of Masters to victory, causing him to lose all hope - until some familiar ninja arrive. In order to stop Unagami, the ninja must obtain three Key-tanas, the first of which is hidden in the game zone Terra Karana - one of Prime Empire's most dangerous game environments.  While being chased by Unagami's dreaded Red Visors the ninja must climb the 'Cliffs of Hysteria', however, they make a startling discovery: Unagami is converting players into energy cubes in order to build a portal into the real world!  Once reunited with Jay, the ninja travel across three game zones to obtain three Key-Tanas, which unlock the final challenge at the Temple of Madness. On the journey, they are hunted by Unagami's digital troops, the Red Visors. In the first game zone, Terra Karana, the ninja meet a non-player character (NPC) called Okino, who helps them through many deadly challenges. In the boss battle, the ninja win the fight against the Red Dragon to obtain the purple Key-Tana. The ninja learn that the only way to acquire the 2nd Key-tana is by winning a race in Terra Technica and have to find racing cars in unexpected ways.  The yellow Key-Tana is obtained by winning the Speedway Five-Billion, a dangerous race in the second game zone, Terra Technica. Lloyd recruits Racer Seven, another NPC, but she is followed by the Red Visors. Scott sacrifices himself to help the ninja escape and is transformed into a digital cube. The ninja manage to win the Speedway Five-Billion, but Kai and Cole are both cubed during the race. Lloyd, Jay and Nya continue their journey to obtain the final Key-tana in the third game zone, Terra Domina. There Lloyd is forced to battle an avatar of Harumi. He defeats her and obtains the orange Key-Tana, but is cubed in the process.

In the real world, Zane discovers the location of Dyer, only to get captured by the Mechanic. When P.I.X.A.L. finds Dyer, he reveals that Scott was a test player who became trapped inside the game (which was named Unagami), when Dyer requested that Scott receive an intense gaming experience. Dyer shut the game down, but Unagami survived. Zane is forced to give the Prime Empire motherboard to the Mechanic, who uses it to create a portal from the game into the real world.

In Prime Empire, Jay and Nya reach a digital sushi restaurant in the Temple of Madness, but Nya is cubed after being defeated by an NPC called Sushimi. After reaching the final level, Jay confronts Unagami, who transforms himself into the Empire Dragon. Jay follows him through the portal into the real world by riding on his Cyber Dragon. Back in the real world, Jay lures Unagami to the top of Borg Tower. Dyer apologises to Unagami, who forgives him. He agrees to release all the players and NPCs who are trapped inside the game. Unagami, who is now a child, and Dyer are finally reunited.

Episodes

Accolades 
In 2021, Prime Empire received three nominations in the Animation Series category of the Leo Awards for Best Art Direction, Sound, and Voice Performance. Kenny Ng was announced as winner for Best Art Direction for the episode Superstar Rockin' Jay.

Other media 
The season was preceded by the release of six short films titled Prime Empire Original Shorts, which were released on the Lego YouTube channel. The shorts introduced some of the main characters of the season including Unagami and The Mechanic.

References

Primary

Secondary 

Prime Empire
2020 Canadian television seasons
2020 Danish television seasons
Massively multiplayer online role-playing games in fiction